The 1997–98 Northern Football League season was the 100th in the history of Northern Football League, a football competition in England.

Division One

Division One featured 16 clubs which competed in the division last season, along with four new clubs.
 Promoted from Division Two:
 Billingham Town
 Jarrow Roofing BCA
 Northallerton Town
 Plus:
 Penrith, transferred from the North West Counties League

League table

Division Two

Division Two featured 15 clubs which competed in the division last season, along with four new clubs.
Clubs relegated from Division One:
 Chester-le-Street Town
 West Auckland Town
 Whickham
 Plus:
 Marske United, joined from the Wearside Football League

League table

References

External links
 Northern Football League official site

Northern Football League seasons
1997–98 in English football leagues